Polygonum erectum, commonly called erect knotweed, is a North American species of herbaceous plant in the buckwheat family (Polygonaceae). It is found primarily in the northeastern and north-central parts of the United States, but with scattered populations in other parts of the US and also in Canada. 

Its natural habitat is in bottomland forests and riparian areas. It is tolerant of ecological degradation, and can also be found in disturbed open areas such as pastures and lawns.

It was once cultivated for food by Native Americans as part of the group of crops known as the Eastern Agricultural Complex.

Description
The leaves have distinct veins and entire edges or have jagged cut edges. The pedicels are shorter or equal the length of the calyx and typically longer than the ocreae. Flowers in clusters of 1 to 5 in cymes that are produced in the axils of most leaves. The calyx segments are unequal with the outer lobes longer and not keeled and the inner ones narrowly keeled. The tepals are greenish, with yellowish tinting or sometimes with whitish tints.

Conservation
Polygonum erectum is considered to be globally secure. However, it is uncommon throughout much of its range, and population have declined dramatically in some regions. It is listed as endangered in New Hampshire and New York.

References

erectum
Flora of Canada
Flora of the United States
Crops originating from Pre-Columbian North America
Plants used in Native American cuisine
Plants described in 1753
Taxa named by Carl Linnaeus
Pseudocereals